Strategic studies is an interdisciplinary academic field centered on the study of conflict and peace strategies, often devoting special attention to the relationship between international politics, geostrategy, international diplomacy, international economics, and military power. In the scope of the studies are also subjects such as the role of intelligence, diplomacy, and international cooperation for security and defense. The subject is normally taught at the post-graduate academic or professional, usually strategic-political and strategic-military levels.

The academic foundations of the subject began with classic texts initially from the Orient such as Sun Tzu’s Art of War and went on to gain a European focus with Carl von Clausewitz’s On War. Like Clausewitz, many academics in this field reject monocausal theories and hypotheses that reduce the study of conflict to one independent variable and one dependent variable.  Already in the late eighteenth century, a colourful mathematician named Dietrich Heinrich von Bülow attempted to establish mathematical formulae for the conduct of war.  Carl von Clausewitz rejected Bülow’s approach and his popular claim that warfare could be reduced to positivist, teachable principles of war.  Instead of formulae, we find Clausewitz stressing, time and again, that the whole purpose of educating the military commander is not to give him a series of answers for the task he will face (the complexities of which cannot be foreseen), but to educate him about different aspects of what will face him so as to let him evaluate the situation for himself, and develop his own strategy.  Strategic thinkers on the whole will search for recurrent patterns, which in themselves cannot predict the characteristics of any individual case even if it doubtless fits a larger category; not all patterns of characteristics will be found in all cases.

In recent times, the major conflicts of the nineteenth century and the two World Wars have spurred strategic thinkers such as Mahan, Corbett, Giulio Douhet, Liddell Hart and, later, André Beaufre. The Cold War with its danger of degenerating into a nuclear war produced an expansion of the discipline, with authors like Bernard Brodie, Michael Howard, Raymond Aron, Lucien Poirier, Lawrence Freedman, Colin Gray, and many others.

Higher education

The subject is taught in Africa, Asia, the Americas and Europe.

In Nigeria, Institute for Peace and Strategic Studies, Nigerian Defence Academy, University of Ibadan, Covenant University and in the Conflict, Peace and Strategic Studies at Afe Babalola University Nigeria and Nassarawa State University Keffi offers Security and Strategic Studies at Masters and Ph.D. Level.  In South Africa, the Faculty of Military Science at the University of Stellenbosch provides a number of courses in strategic studies from the undergraduate to PhD level.  The Faculty of Military Science, co-located at the South African Military Academy in Saldanha is also involved in the teaching of the discipline at the South African Defence and War Colleges.

In Europe the subject is taught at the University of St Andrews, the University of Reading, Aberystwyth University, the University of Aberdeen, the University of Exeter, the University of Hull, King's College London, and the University of Leeds (all in the United Kingdom), University of Rome III, Università degli Studi di Milano, University of Turin (all of the three in Italy), the University of Granada (in Spain), the National Defence University (in Finland), the Charles University in Prague, Netherlands Defence College Breda (the Netherlands), and the Université Paris 13 Nord SciencesPo (in France), University College Cork (Ireland), University of Warsaw (Poland).

In the Americas it is taught in Chile, Canada, Brazil, Mexico, United States.
In Brazil it is taught at the Universidade Federal do Rio Grande do Sul, Universidade Federal do Rio de Janeiro and Universidade Federal Fluminense. In Canada it is taught in University of Calgary and the Royal Military College in Canada.
In Chile, it is taught in the National Academy of Political and Strategic Studies, Ministry of Defense.
In the U.S. the subject is taught in many state, private, and military universities, including the University of Missouri, United States Military Academy, United States Air Force Academy, Georgetown University, Johns Hopkins University, Missouri State University, the University of Texas at El Paso, Norwich University,  Temple University, the U.S. Army War College, Air University's Air War College, U.S. Naval War College, Marine Corps War College, and the National Defense University.

In Asia and the Pacific it is also taught in several countries. In Bangladesh it is taught at the national universities, Bangladesh University of Professionals, the National Defense University, and the military academies. 
In Australia it is taught in the Australian National University. In New Zealand it is taught at Victoria University of Wellington. In Singapore the S. Rajaratnam School of International Studies in Singapore. In Malaysia University of Malaya.

In Pakistan the subject is taught in several universities, but predominantly in Quaid-I-Azam University (QAU), National Defence University (NDU), University of Punjab, and Fatima Jinnah Women's University. In India, Deen Dyal Upadhyay Gorakhpur University, Savitribai Phule Pune University and University of Allahabad and National Defence University in Pakistan.  Turkish War Academy has also Strategic Research Institute (SAREN) in which the subject is taught at both masters and doctoral levels.

See also
 U.S. Army Strategist

References

 
Peace and conflict studies